The 2018 South Carolina gubernatorial election was held on November 6, 2018, to elect the Governor of South Carolina. Incumbent Republican Governor Henry McMaster, who took office after Nikki Haley resigned to become U.S. Ambassador to the United Nations, ran for election to a full term. The primary was held on June 12, with the Democrats nominating State Representative James E. Smith Jr. McMaster failed to win a majority of the vote, and then defeated John Warren in the Republican runoff on June 26. In the general election, McMaster defeated Smith, winning election to a full term.

Republican primary

Candidates

Nominee
 Henry McMaster, incumbent governor
 Running mate: Pamela Evette, businesswoman

Defeated in runoff
 John Warren, businessman
 Running mate: Pat McKinney, businessman

Defeated in primary
 Kevin Bryant, incumbent Lieutenant Governor
 Yancey McGill, former Democratic lieutenant governor and former Democratic state senator
 Catherine Templeton, attorney, former director of the Department of Health and Environmental Control and former director of the Department of Labor, Licensing and Regulation
 Running mate: Walt Wilkins, Greenville County Solicitor

Declined
 Tom Davis, state senator
 Jeff Duncan, U.S. Representative
 Mikee Johnson, businessman and former chairman of the South Carolina Chamber of Commerce (endorsed Catherine Templeton)
 Tim Scott, U.S. Senator
 Joe Taylor, former South Carolina Secretary of Commerce
 Billy Wilkins, former Chief Judge of the United States Court of Appeals for the Fourth Circuit
 Alan Wilson, attorney general (running for re-election)

Endorsements

First round

Polling

Results

Runoff

Polling

Results

Democratic primary

Candidates

Nominee
 James Smith, state representative
 Running mate: Mandy Powers Norrell, state representative

Defeated in Primary
 Phil Noble, business and technology consultant and candidate for lieutenant governor in 1994
 Running mate: Gloria Bromell Tinubu, former Atlanta, Georgia City Councilwoman, former Georgia State Representative and nominee for SC-07 in 2012 and 2014
 Marguerite Willis, attorney
 Running mate: John Scott, state senator

Declined
 Steve Benjamin, Mayor of Columbia
 Marlon Kimpson, state senator
 Inez Tenenbaum, former State Superintendent of Education, former chair of the Consumer Product Safety Commission and nominee for the U.S. Senate in 2004

Endorsements

Polling

Results

Independents and Third Parties

Declared
 Phil Cheney (Independent), former Anderson City Councilman, candidate for SC-03 in 2006 and write-in candidate for SC-05 in 2017

Failed Nomination
 Martin Barry (American Party), medication researcher, nomination declined by the American Party 
 Running mate: James Cartee, theater director

General election

Predictions

Endorsements

Polling

Results

See also
2018 South Carolina elections

References

External links
 Candidates at Vote Smart 
 Candidates at Ballotpedia

Official campaign websites
 Henry McMaster (R) for Governor
 James Smith (D) for Governor

2018
2018 United States gubernatorial elections
2018 South Carolina elections